Bulgarian football champions mean those that won the highest league in Bulgarian football, which since 2016-2017 is the First Professional League.

The first national football competition in Bulgaria was established in 1924 by the Bulgarian National Sport Federation and was named Bulgarian State Football Championship. The championship was a knockout tournament featuring six clubs that had won six regional divisions. These divisions were round-robin tournaments that included football clubs that were founded in different geographic areas. The winners of each division were drawn in pairs at random for each of the three one-match rounds. Two of the clubs qualified directly for the second round (the semi-final stage) and the other four had to play two quarter-final matches. The championship didn't finish in years 1924, 1927 and 1944 because of different reasons. At the end of the 1925 season, Vladislav Varna were the first club to be crowned champions.

The championship had many changes in its format during the years, mainly in the number of legs played in each round and the number of teams that qualified from the regional divisions. In seasons 1937–38, 1938–39 and 1939–40 the championship was reorganised to a 10 club National Football Division but it proved to be an unsuccessful decision and from season 1940–41 the division was reverted to a knockout tournament.

After 1944 it was replaced by the Republic Championship. It was organised for only four years between 1945 and 1948. The championship was a knockout tournament featuring clubs that had finished at the top of six regional divisions. These divisions were round-robin tournaments that included football clubs from different geographic areas.

CSKA Sofia have won 31 titles, the most of any club. CSKA's rivals Levski Sofia are second with 26. Ludogorets Razgrad are third; the team is currently in a streak of 11 consecutive titles, which is the best in Bulgarian football. Slavia Sofia is in fourth place, with 7 titles, 6 of which were won before the Second World War.

State Championship (1924–1944)

Republic Championship (1945–1948)

Key

A Grupa (1948–2022)

Key

Performances

Performance by club

Bold indicates clubs currently playing in the top division. 
Italics indicates clubs that no longer exist.

 
Notes: 
 CSKA Sofia titles include those won as Septemvri pri CDNV, CDNA, and CFKA-Sredets.
 Levski Sofia titles include those won as Levski-Spartak and Vitosha, as well as the re-awarded 1984/85 title.
 Cherno More Varna titles have been won as Vladislav Varna(3) and Ticha Varna(1), as Cherno More is considered their descendant.
 Botev Plovdiv total does not include the Trakia originally awarded 1984/85 title.
 Spartak Varna title has been won as Shipchenski Sokol.

Performance by city

The following table lists the Bulgarian champions by cities.

Notes: 
Italics indicates clubs that no longer exist.

References

External links
a-pfg.com
bulgarian-football.com

champions
Bulgaria